Klinci is a village in the municipality of Valjevo, Serbia. According to the 2002 census, the village has a population of 269 people, and according to the census conducted in 2011 in Klinci was 233 inhabitants.

They are located on the fifth kilometer road Valjevo - Suvobor - Cacak, between the villages Beloševac, Petnica, Žabari and Paune, occupying almost the entire hair hill that begins over Petnica cave and extends to the north. The old village was Palanka, and that there was a village before and during the Battle of Kosovo proves that as until recently plowed debris courts, the remains of materials, various tools and old coins from the Ottoman era.

Name

Name of the old village was Palanka, and that's the place in the middle of the village. According to legend, in which it still believes Klinci are named after the nickname of one of its inhabitants. Some Mitar, it is said, he went to Srem to sell oxen. After he sold oxen, it happened that he bought sandals with nails. As the footwear were poorly versed, that Mitar get wound in one leg the leg, and after that all peasants called him Mitar Klinčanin.

Transport

The distance from city center and village is only 6km, and there is asphalt road to the village which is built in 1979. Village has no railway station but there is bus station in the village and several departures of public transport during the day. The distance between Klinci and tourist center Divcibare is 29 km. Distance between Klinci and Vrujci is 23 km.

Agriculture

The most developed agricultural sectors are livestock breeding, fruit growing and farming. From cattle are represented noble breed of cattle, pigs and sheep. The most common breeds of cows are domestic spotted cattle of Simmental and a small number of Holstein breed and crossbreds these two races. In pigs has the most Landrace and Pietrain, and their crossbreeds. In sheep is the most common is strain of Sjenica, and in smaller numbers Wurttemberg. Since most grains are grown corn, barley and wheat. In smaller quantities and oats.

Infrastructure

In the village there is no sewage system. The water supply system was built in 1998; since then the inhabitants have had unlimited access to clean drinking water. The village has electricity and streetlights; most of the houses have telephone and internet connections. 

Demographics

In the village live 233 inhabitants, with average age of 47. There is 84 households, and the average number of members per household is 3,20. Village is populated with Serbian people, but there is many foreign people who is coming back from big cities to feel great life at village.

References

Populated places in Kolubara District

sr:Клинци